The MV Al Arabia was a roro-ferry which has seen service on several routes. The ship was built for the Belgium state-owner operator Regie voor Maritiem Transport België as the Prinses Maria Esmeralda. She sailed on the Ostend-Dover route.

Under the name Wisteria she also sailed on the route Ostend-Ramsgate and on the Almeria to Nador line.

History
In 1975 the Belliard Shipyard built the ship under dock-number 877. The ship was ordered by the state-owned operator  Regie voor Maritiem Transport België. She was christened Prinses Maria Esmeralda. She sailed on the Dover-Ostend route.

In 1995 the ship was sold to Transeuropa Ferries and renamed MV Wisteria to sail on the Ostend-Ramsgate route.

During some summers the ship was chartered to ferry-operators between Spain and Morocco and Tunisia. Since 2000 she moved permanently to run on the Almeria to Nador route until she was sold for scrapping in 2007 to India

Sisterships

The Prinses Maria Esmeralda was one of three sisterships ordered by RMT. The Prins Albert and the Princesse Marie Christine.

References and footnotes

Ferries of Belgium
1975 ships
Transeuropa Ferries